Rear Admiral Raydon William Gates,  (born 1 January 1952) is a retired senior officer of the Royal Australian Navy. He was later the chief executive of Lockheed Martin Australia & New Zealand from 2010 to 2016.

References

|-

1952 births
Military personnel from Western Australia
Australian chief executives
Foreign recipients of the Legion of Merit
Living people
Lockheed Martin people
Monash University alumni
Officers of the Order of Australia
People from Perth, Western Australia
Recipients of the Conspicuous Service Medal
Recipients of the Ordre du Mérite Maritime
Royal Australian Navy admirals